The England cricket team toured Sri Lanka from 26 March to 7 April 2012. The tour included two Tests between Sri Lanka and England. With England's victory in the Second Test, they retained their top spot on the world Test rankings.

Squads

Tour matches

First-class: Sri Lanka Board XI vs England XI

First-class: Sri Lanka Cricket Development XI vs England XI

Test series

1st Test

2nd Test

References

2012 in English cricket
2012 in Sri Lankan cricket
2011-12
International cricket competitions in 2011–12
Sri Lankan cricket seasons from 2000–01